Ocean Park is a census-designated place (CDP) in Pacific County, Washington, United States. The population was 1,573 at the 2010 census. It is on the Long Beach Peninsula, north of Long Beach, Washington.

Geography
Ocean Park is found at  (46.493908, -124.047921). It is on the Long Beach Peninsula and adjacent to Pacific Pines State Park.

According to the United States Census Bureau, the CDP has a total area of 3.9 square miles (10.0 km2), of which, 3.0 square miles (7.9 km2) of it is land and 0.8 square miles (2.1 km2) of it (21.45%) is water.

Demographics
As of the census of 2000, there were 1,459 people, 710 households, and 416 families residing in the CDP. The population density was 480.2 people per square mile (185.3/km2). There were 1,505 housing units at an average density of 495.3/sq mi (191.1/km2). The racial makeup of the CDP was 94.52% White, 0.27% African American, 1.85% Native American, 0.27% Asian, 0.07% Pacific Islander, 1.64% from other races, and 1.37% from two or more races. Hispanic or Latino of any race were 4.18% of the population. 25.0% were of German, 13.4% English, 12.9% Irish and 5.2% Swedish ancestry according to Census 2000.

There were 710 households, of which 17.0% had children under the age of 18 living with them, 46.9% were married couples living together, 8.6% had a female householder with no husband present, and 41.4% were non-families. 34.1% of all households were made up of individuals, and 18.5% had someone living alone who was 65 years of age or older. The average household size was 2.05 and the average family size was 2.55.

In the CDP, the population's age distribution was spread out, with 16.6% under the age of 18, 5.3% from 18 to 24, 18.8% from 25 to 44, 28.7% from 45 to 64, and 30.6% who were 65 years of age or older. The median age was 52 years. For every 100 females, there were 99.9 males. For every 100 females age 18 and over, there were 95.0 males.

The median income for a household in the CDP was $22,932, and the median income for a family was $30,208. Males had a median income of $35,536 versus $21,528 for females. The per capita income for the CDP was $18,261. About 7.3% of families and 15.3% of the population were below the poverty line, including 27.9% of those under age 18 and 4.9% of those age 65 or over.

History
Ocean Park was once a station on the Ilwaco Railway and Navigation Company, a narrow gauge railroad that ran along the Long Beach Peninsula from 1889 to 1930. One of the oldest buildings in Pacific County is the Taylor Hotel building, built in 1887, currently in use as Adelaide's Cafe and Bookstore named after Adelaide Taylor, the wife of the original hotel owner. The oldest building in Ocean Park is the Lamberson Cabin, built in 1883 by Buell Lamberson. The cabin has been kept in private family ownership through the generations for the use of Lamberson descendants.

References

External links

Ocean Park Chamber of Commerce
Ocean Park at City-Data.com

Census-designated places in Pacific County, Washington
Census-designated places in Washington (state)
Populated coastal places in Washington (state)